Midnight Offerings is a 1981 American made-for-television horror film directed by Rod Holcomb, and starring Melissa Sue Anderson, Mary Beth McDonough, and Patrick Cassidy. Its plot follows a teenage witch who uses her powers to vie for the attention of her former boyfriend. The film premiered on ABC in February 1981.

Cast
Melissa Sue Anderson as Vivian Sotherland
Mary Beth McDonough as Robin Prentiss
Patrick Cassidy as David Sterling
Marion Ross as Emily Moore
Gordon Jump as Sherman Sotherland
Cathryn Damon as Diane Sotherland
Dana Kimmell as Lily

References

External links

1981 films
1981 television films
1981 horror films
1980s English-language films
1980s supernatural horror films
1980s teen horror films
American Broadcasting Company original programming
American horror television films
American supernatural horror films
American teen horror films
Films about witchcraft
Films directed by Rod Holcomb
Films scored by Walter Scharf
1980s American films